Paul Mirkovich (born March 20, 1963) is an American musician from Los Angeles. He has been the band leader, keyboardist and duet singing partner for Cher for the last 16 years. He has also been the band director for Janet Jackson and Anastacia and a member of the multi-platinum bands Whitesnake and Nelson. Mirkovich played a role in Brett Garsed and T. J. Helmerich's albums Quid pro quo (1992) and Exempt (1993). Paul has also performed and recorded with Peter Gabriel and Shawn Colvin, among many others.  Paul and the House Band toured the United States with Paul Stanley (from KISS) in October/November 2006 as well as Australia in April 2007.

Mirkovich currently serves as musical director of NBC's talent competition, "The Voice", which is produced by Mark Burnett. 
For "The Voice" he has arranged over 2000 songs and over 1000 iTunes recordings for the show.
In addition to playing for coaches Adam Levine, Blake Shelton, Ceelo Green, Christina Aguilera, Usher, Pharrell Williams,
Shakira, Alicia Keys and Gwen Stefani on "The Voice", he has also played with many other artists including Celine Dion, Smokey Robinson, Mary J. Blige, Ellie Goulding, Ryan Tedder, Ariana Grande, and Cher.

Mark Burnett was also executive producer of Rock Star, on which Mirkovich also served as musical director.  
Mirkovich is of Croatian descent.

Mirkovich also serves as a record producer. In November 2021, singer-songwriter Taylor Swift released her second re-recorded album Red (Taylor's Version). Mirkovich co-produced three songs of the album with Swift and Christopher Rowe, including 	"Sad Beautiful Tragic",  	"Starlight", and "The Moment I Knew".

Musical Director of the Rock Star House Band
Paul received a call from the music producer of Rock Star, Clyde Lieberman, and was asked to audition for the role of musical director for the show.  He competed against 11 other musical directors who had also put bands together (a total of 75 - 80 musicians auditioned).  Paul got the gig.  Two of his band members, Rafael Moreira (lead guitar) and Sasha Krivtsov (bass), were also hired.  Jim McGorman (rhythm guitar, keyboards) and Nate Morton (drums, percussion) were hired from the other auditioning bands.
Paul has also served as musical director/keyboardist for Pink from 2006 till the present.
Besides Cher and Pink he has served as musical director for Janet Jackson, Christina Aguilera,Hilary Duff and others.

Alongside Paul Shaffer, Paul Mirkovich is arguably the most visible keyboardist on the planet. As musical director and keyboard player for the Rock Star INXS House Band, Paul is seen no less than three nights a week on prime time TV by millions of viewers. And he makes it look like cake, as he and his ace band mates springboard from genre to genre with the greatest of ease. But, as you might expect, the gig is anything but smooth behind the scenes.

Early Influences
"I don’t remember a specific moment in which I made a conscious decision that music would be it for me. It’s all I’ve ever really known."  It started when I was four years old. One day I was watching a cartoon show. I think it was ‘Casper the Ghost’. The theme song stuck in my head. I went over to the piano and started playing it. Over time, I took lessons and got into bee-bop and jazz along the way. Being from Los Angeles, music is simply all around you. Just as the steel mills may be for folks in Pittsburgh… Entertainment and music is for the folks in Los Angeles."

Education
Graduated Providence High School (Burbank, California) in 1981.
Attended the Dick Grove School of Music.

References

External links
 Paul Mirkovich (MySpace) Web Site
 Paul Mirkovich on ROCKBANDLOUNGE.COM

American keyboardists
American male singers
American bandleaders
Singers from California
Living people
1963 births
American people of Croatian descent